Country and Irish is a musical subgenre in Ireland formed by mixing North American country-style music with Irish influences. It is especially popular in the rural Midlands and North-West of the country, but less so in urban areas or in the South-West where more traditional Irish music is favoured. It also remains popular among Irish emigrants in Great Britain, particularly among the older generation. In a review of the album  Round the house and mind the dresser: Irish country house dance music,  Vic Gammon observes that the music was partially inspired by a desire for cultural independence.

Artists

Artists who would fit this genre include:

Philomena Begley
Big Tom
Nathan Carter
Richie Kavanagh
Crystal Swing
Larry Cunningham
T.R. Dallas
Mike Denver
Mary Duff
Kathy Durkin
Mick Flavin
Michael English
John Farry
Foster and Allen
Cliona Hagan
John Hogan
James Kilbane
Johnny Loughrey
Margo
Lee Matthews
Susan McCann
Johnny McCauley
Johnny McEvoy
Lisa McHugh
John McNicholl
P. J. Murrihy
Declan Nerney
Paddy O'Brien
Daniel O'Donnell
Derek Ryan

Media
Country and Irish is featured on national and local media. Most local radio stations outside Dublin have a music show dedicated to country music, on programs such as Country Roads and Céilí Lár Tíre on Midlands 103 and on The Country Lounge on CRCfm. RTÉ Radio provide an hour of each Saturday with Country Time with Sandy Harsch.

In television, many of the country and Irish musicians had TV shows on RTÉ One during the 1980s such as The Sandy Kelly Show and The Red Hurley Show, but by the 1990s many of those shows had been axed by RTÉ. RTÉ also broadcast Country Music Television on RTÉ Two during the 1990s. In the 2000s, RTÉ produced a retrospective series, A Little Bit Country, featuring stars from the golden era of Irish country music.

The Irish Language Television service TG4 has provided a number of country and Irish programmes in its schedules such as Glór Tíre ("Country Voice").

Ireland West Music Television, a 24-hour country and Irish channel, was founded in the UK and Ireland in 2011.

References 

Irish styles of music
Irish